Gregory Little or Greg Little may refer to:

Greg Little (wide receiver) (born 1989), American football wide receiver
Greg Little (offensive lineman) (born 1997), American football player
Greg Little (association football), former association football player